Klokotnica (Cyrillic: Клокотница) is a town in the municipality of Doboj Istok, Bosnia and Herzegovina. Klokotnica is administrative centre of Doboj Istok.

Demographics 
According to the 2013 census, its population was 4,874.

References

Populated places in Doboj Istok